Charles Diawisie Taylor (born 1 January 2000) is a Ghanaian professional footballer who currently plays as a striker for Sudanese club Al-Merrikh on loan from Egyptian Premier League club Future FC. He previously played for Bibiani Gold Stars.

Career

Karela United 
Taylor joined Karela United in January 2017. In his debut season, the 2016–17 Ghana Division One season, he had a slow start after playing 7 matches for the Nzema-based outfit without scoring. Taylor scored his debut goal in a 2–1 away win against Bekwai Youth Football Academy, before picking a knee injury a week later in the MTN FA Cup round of 64 match against Samraboi-based Samartex. He returned from injury to play the latter part of the season featuring in the last 4 matches of the season as Karela United were crowned champions of the Ghana Division One League Zone II and qualify to the Premier League for the first time in the club's history.

He made his premier league debut for Karela in the Ghana Premier League on 17 March 2018, in a 1–0 home defeat to title favourites Medeama, he started and played the full game. On 1 April 2018, Taylor made history by scoring Karela's first ever Ghana Premier League goal via an assist from Donald Wellington, who also scored the third in a 3–0 win at home against Ebusua Dwarfs to grant Karela the club's first ever win in the Ghana Premier League after losing two and drawing one in their first three matches. Taylor's goal was scored in the 14th second after kick off making it the fastest goal in the Ghana Premier League history. In July 2018, the season was halted due to the suspension of the Ghana Football Association after the release of the Anas Number 12 expose. He ended the season with 7 appearances and a goal. On the opening week of the 2019 GFA Normalization Competition, Taylor scored the second goal in Karela's 2–1 victory over Ebusua Dwarfs. He went on to score a brace in three consecutive matches against Liberty Professionals, West African Football Academy and  International Allies. Karela placed second in Group B behind Hearts of Oak and qualified to the Championship playoff. In the semi-final play-off on 19 June 2019, Taylor scored the winning goal connecting a pass from Solomon Sarfo Taylor in the fourth minute of second-half stoppage time to give Karela a 1–0 victory over Ashanti Gold at the Len Clay Stadium. On 23 June, he played in the championship final, where Karela lost 4–1 on penalties against Asante Kotoko after the match ended 1–1.

Taylor scored a brace in the 2020–21 Ghana Premier League match against Berekum Chelsea on 17 January 2021.

Future 
In October 2021, Taylor joined Egyptian club Future FC on a three-year deal for an undisclosed fee.

Honours 
Karela United

 Ghana Division One League Zone II: 2017

Individual

 Ghana Division One League Top Scorer: 2016
 GFA Special Competition Top Scorer: 2019
 Ghana Premier League Top Scorer: 2020–21
 Ghana Premier League Player of the Month: January 2021

References

External links 

 

2000 births
Living people
Ghanaian footballers
Ghana Premier League players
Association football forwards
Karela United FC players
Future FC (Egypt) players
Ghana Premier League top scorers